The group stage of the 1994–95 UEFA Champions League began on 14 September 1994 and ended on 7 December 1994. Eight teams qualified automatically for the group stage, while eight more qualified via a preliminary round. The 16 teams were divided into four groups of four, and the teams in each group played against each other on a home-and-away basis, meaning that each team played a total of six group matches. For each win, teams were awarded three points, with one point awarded for each draw. At the end of the group stage, the two teams in each group with the most points advanced to the quarter-finals.

Groups

Group A

Group B

Group C

Group D

Salzburg goalkeeper Otto Konrad was hit on the head with a plastic bottle thrown from the stands, sustaining an injury for which he had to be substituted and taken to the hospital. Milan were docked two points and banned from playing their next two home matches at their home ground, San Siro.

Group Stage
1994-95